The 2018 London Skolars season was the 24th in the club's history, and sixteenth as a professional rugby league outfit. Competing in Betfred League 1, the third tier of British Rugby League and playing at the New River Stadium, London N22, the team was coached by Jermaine Coleman for the fourth consecutive season.

News 

The London Skolars bowed out of this season's Ladbrokes sponsored Challenge Cup at the third round stage following a narrow 14-16 reversal at fellow Betfred League 1 outfit, Whitehaven R.L.F.C.

The London Skolars became the first club to host the world’s first Transatlantic rugby team, Toronto Wolfpack, in their Championship game against Yorkshire side Halifax R.L.F.C. on Saturday 28 April 2018.

Table

Betfred League 1

Fixtures and results
2018 RFL League 1 results

References

External links
skolarsrl.com

2018 in English rugby league
2018 in rugby league by club
London Skolars seasons
London Skolars season